The Ministry of Health is a ministry of the government of Guinea, with its headquarters in the capital city Conakry.

, the Minister of Health is Colonel Remy Lamah.

Officeholders since 2010

See also 
 Health in Guinea

References 

Government of Guinea
Health in Guinea
Guinea